Mohsenabad, also rendered as Muhsinabad, may refer to:

Alborz Province
Mohsenabad, Alborz

East Azerbaijan Province
Mohsenabad, Malekan, a village in Malekan County
Mohsenabad, Maragheh, a village in Maragheh County
Mohsenabad, Sarab, a village in Sarab County

Fars Province
Mohsenabad, Fars, a village in Kazerun County

Gilan Province
Mohsenabad, Gilan, a village in Astaneh-ye Ashrafiyeh County
Mohsenabad-e Pain, a village in Astaneh-ye Ashrafiyeh County

Isfahan Province
Mohsenabad, Isfahan, a village in Borkhar County

Kerman Province
Mohsenabad, Kerman, a village in Kerman County

Markazi Province
Mohsenabad, Ashtian, Markazi Province

Mazandaran Province
Mohsenabad, Mazandaran, a village in Neka County

Qom Province

Razavi Khorasan Province
Mohsenabad, Chenaran, Razavi Khorasan Province
Mohsenabad, Fariman, Razavi Khorasan Province
Mohsenabad, Mashhad, Razavi Khorasan Province
Mohsenabad, Zeberkhan, Nishapur County, Razavi Khorasan Province
Mohsenabad, Taybad, Razavi Khorasan Province

Sistan and Baluchestan Province
Mohsenabad, Sistan and Baluchestan, a village in Khash County

Tehran Province

Yazd Province
Mohsenabad, Yazd, a village in Taft County

Zanjan Province
Mohsenabad, Zanjan, a village in Zanjan County